Per Mats Stefan Erixon (born 19 March 1958) is a Swedish long-distance runner. He competed in the men's 5000 metres at the 1984 Summer Olympics.

References

1958 births
Living people
Athletes (track and field) at the 1984 Summer Olympics
Swedish male long-distance runners
Olympic athletes of Sweden
Place of birth missing (living people)